Nevian Cani (born 25 February 1986 in Shkodër) is a former Albanian football player who played for Vllaznia Shkodër, Shkumbini Peqin, Flamurtari Vlorë, Besëlidhja Lezhë and Ada Velipojë in Albania, as well as SV Kirchzarten in Germany.

References

1986 births
Living people
Footballers from Shkodër
Albanian footballers
Association football forwards
KF Vllaznia Shkodër players
KS Shkumbini Peqin players
Flamurtari Vlorë players
Besëlidhja Lezhë players
KS Ada Velipojë players
Albanian expatriate footballers
Albanian expatriate sportspeople in Germany
Expatriate footballers in Germany